Kurulu Pihatu (Bird Feathers) is a 2006 Sri Lankan Sinhala philosophical drama film directed by Sumith Kumara and produced by Paul Newman for F.T Entertainments. It stars Sajitha Anthony and Jackson Anthony in lead roles along with Dilhani Ekanayake and Hemasiri Liyanage. Music composed by Ananda Gamage. It is the 1165th Sri Lankan film in the Sinhala cinema.

Plot
Saman is a 13-year-old innocent boy who wishes to be ordained. He is neglected by his parents, who are separated. Most of times, Saman spends time on road with his grandfather, who is a beggar. One day, He meets a monk and tells about his wish to become a monk. The monk asks him to get permission from parents. Saman returns home to get permissions from his mother, Shalika, who has remarried recently. Her husband, Charuka expels Saman from the house before Saman can meet Shalika. After that, Saman starts living with his grandfather.

Saman's father, Chandrasekara blames Shalika for Saman's missing. Shalika is worried and gets angry when Charuka calls Saman as a beggar. She quarrels with him, after which Charuka abandons her.

Rain destroys Saman and his grandfather's shelter. Exposed to the storm, they both catch pneumonia. Saman's grandfather dies. Chandrasekara finds shivering Saman on road and rushes him to hospital. Shalika apologizes from Saman for her mistakes. Then, she permits Saman to become a monk.

Finally, Saman recovers and is ordained. His parents and grandmother visit him to get blessings.

Cast
 Sajitha Anthony as Saman
 Jackson Anthony as Chandrasekara
 Dilhani Ekanayake as Shalika
 Hemasiri Liyanage as Shalika's father
 Suresh Gamage as Charuka
 Seetha Kumari as Chandrasekara's mother
 Saranapala Jayasuriya 
 Nanda Wickramage as Head Monk
 Sarath Chandrasiri as Waiter
 Kapila Sigera
 Muthu Tharanga as Chandrasekara's girlfriend

References

2006 films
2000s Sinhala-language films
2006 drama films
Sri Lankan drama films